Harry Arundel (February 1855 – March 25, 1904) was an American Major League Baseball player who pitched for three seasons. He played for the 1875 Brooklyn Atlantics, the 1882 Pittsburgh Alleghenys, and the 1884 Providence Grays. He also played minor league baseball with the Akrons of Ohio in 1881. Arundel was born in Philadelphia in February 1855, and died at the age of 49 of Bright's disease. He is interred at Woodland Cemetery in Cleveland, Ohio.

References
General
McBane, Richard. 2005. A fine-looking lot of ball-tossers: the remarkable Akrons of 1881. McFarland. .
Specific

External links

Harry Arundel at Find a Grave

1855 births
1904 deaths
Baseball players from Pennsylvania
Major League Baseball pitchers
19th-century baseball players
Brooklyn Atlantics players
Pittsburgh Alleghenys players
Providence Grays players
Janesville Mutual players
Binghamton Crickets (1870s) players
Grand Rapids (minor league baseball) players
Franklin (minor league baseball) players
St. Paul Apostles players
Milwaukee Brewers (minor league) players
East Liberty Liberty Stars players
Springfield (minor league baseball) players
Oswego Sweegs players
Burials at Woodland Cemetery (Cleveland)